The Arena Racing Company Grand Prix (formerly the William Hill Grand Prix) is a greyhound racing competition inaugurated in 2007. It was held at Sunderland over 640 metres and formed part of a festival of racing at the track which also included the Classic.

The race is not to be confused with the defunct classic race The Grand Prix formerly held at Walthamstow before its closure.

Prize money levels were significant which propelled the race to Category One status but the new stadium owners Arena Racing Company (who bought the stadium in 2017) did not run the event during 2019 and 2020.

In 2021, the competition was renamed from the William Hill Grand Prix to the Arena Racing Company Grand Prix.

Past winners

+ dead heat

Distances & Venue 
2007–present (Sunderland, 640 metres)

Sponsors
2007–2018 (William Hill)
2022–present (Arena Racing Company)

References

Greyhound racing competitions in the United Kingdom
Recurring sporting events established in 2007
Sport in the City of Sunderland